Bülach is an historic town and a municipality in Switzerland in the canton of Zürich. It is the administrative capital of Bülach district.

The official language of Bülach is Swiss Standard German, but the main spoken language is the local variant of the Alemannic Swiss German dialect.

History

Bülach is first mentioned in 811 as Pulacha. From early times it fell within the province of the Alamanni. Joachim Werner's description of the early cemetery excavated there was published in 1953.

Geography
Of this area, 33.2% is used for agricultural purposes, 39.5% is forested, 26.9% is settled (buildings or roads) and the remainder (0.4%) is non-productive (rivers, glaciers or mountains).

The municipality is located around the lower Glatt Valley.  The town of Bülach and the village of Niederflachs are in the valley.  Around the town are the hamlets of Heimgarten am Rinsberg, Eschenmosen (since 1919, earlier part of Winkel) and Nussbaumen am Dettenberg.  The municipality of Bachenbülach was part of Bülach until 1849 when it became an independent municipality.  Bülach is located on the old road from Zürich through Kloten to Eglisau.

Demographics
, 22.6% of the population was made up of foreign nationals. Over the last 10 years the population has grown at a rate of 17.8%. Most of the population speaks German  (83.9%), with Italian being second most common ( 4.7%) and Serbo-Croatian being third ( 2.5%).

In the 2007 election the most popular party was the SVP which received 38.3% of the vote.  The next three most popular parties were the SPS (17%), the CSP (12.5%) and the FDP (11.2%).

The age distribution of the population is as follows: children and teenagers (0–19 years old) make up 23.1% of the population, while adults (20–64 years old) make up 64.8% and seniors (over 64 years old) make up 12.2%.  In Bülach about 73.2% of the population (between age 25-64) have completed either non-mandatory upper secondary education or additional higher education (either university or a Fachhochschule).

The historical population of Bülach is listed in the following table:

Attractions
The Reformed Church and the popular Sigristenkeller gallery stand on a small hill, and are surrounded by pretty old buildings, including the Pfarrhaus and the old Tithe Barn. The church is named after Saint Laurentius, to whom the town's coat of arms is dedicated. Saint Laurentius was deacon to Pope Sixtus II, and became a martyr when he was condemned to death by fire in 258 AD. The church forms a well-matched unit with the Town Hall, and has a tower rising above it to a height of 74 meters. Also on the first Saturday of every month at 6pm, trumpeters play for half an hour from the top of the tower.

Duke Leopold III of Austria (Habsburg) granted Bülach a town charter in 1384, including its own jurisdiction and the right to hold its own market.

Economy and transport
One of the most important institutions in the town and its biggest employer (over 700 employees) is the regional hospital Spital Bülach with 200 beds. Other important employers include the traditional glass producer Vetropack, civil engineering firm Mageba, and the Zürcher Unterländer newspaper.

Bülach has an unemployment rate of 3.07%. , there were 130 people employed in the primary economic sector and about 36 businesses involved in this sector. 1893 people are employed in the secondary sector and there are 133 businesses in this sector. 5596 people are employed in the tertiary sector, with 607 businesses in this sector.

Bülach railway station is a node of the Zürich S-Bahn on the lines S41 and S5. Its train station is a 24-minute (S5) ride from Zürich Hauptbahnhof.

It also has a direct bus link from Zurich Airport which takes 25 minutes on 530 service.

Education
The primary schools include Schuleinheit Böswisli, Schuleinheit Schwerzgrueb, Schuleinheit Lindenhof, and Schuleinheit Hohfuri.

Lower secondary schools include Schule Hinterbirch and Schule Mettmenriet.

The Kantonsschule Zürcher Unterland (KZU) is located in Bülach.

Notable people 

 Sir John Brunner (born 1842) British Industrialist
 Jürg Gutknecht (born 1949) computer scientist
 Daniel Klajner (born 1963) conductor, teaches orchestral conducting at the University of Music and Performing Arts Vienna 
 Claude Meier (born 1964) Divisional general of the Swiss Armed Forces

 Sport
 Kurt Klingler (born 1928) former sports shooter, competed in the 1968 Summer Olympics
 Karl Elsener (1934–2010) football goalkeeper, 34 caps for the Switzerland 1958/1966
 Louis Pfenninger (born 1944) former racing cyclist, competed in the 1964 Summer Olympics
 Ercüment Şahin (born 1968) Turkish retired professional footballer, over 360 club caps
 Marcello Marrocco (born 1969) a retired Italian professional footballer, over 325 club caps
 Martin Plüss (born 1977) retired professional ice hockey player
 Nicola Spirig (born 1982) professional triathlete, competed in the 2012 Summer Olympics
 Sarah Meier (born 1984) former figure skater, eight-time Swiss national champion
 Christine Meier (born 1986) ice hockey player
 Reto Berra (born 1987) professional ice hockey goaltender
 Martina van Berkel (born 1989) butterfly swimmer, competed in the 2012 Summer Olympics
 Ramona Elsener (born 1992) ice dancer
 Eddy Yusof (born 1994) male artistic gymnast, lives in Bülach
 Niels Hintermann (born 1995) World Cup alpine ski racer
 Nico Georgiadis (born 1996) chess grandmaster

References

External links

 Official Homepage of Bülach
 
 Spital Bülach
 Vetropack
 Sigristenkeller Art Gallery

 
Cities in Switzerland
Municipalities of the canton of Zürich